A South Bronx Story is a 2000 compilation album by rock band ESG. Prior to the release of A South Bronx Story, the band's back catalog had been almost impossible to find.

Critical reception
The Village Voice wrote that the group's "drums’n’chants sound resembled a Mardi Gras Indian tribe or Yoruba percussion ensemble as much as the stripped-down funk that Prince and Cameo were pioneering." The Guardian wrote: "Bridging the gap between dance and punk (they once appeared on the same bill as Grandmaster Funk and the Clash), their sound was utterly their own, as this compilation of material from 1980-87 attests."

It ranked #7 on Spin's list of the top 10 reissues of 2000.

Track listing
 all songs written by ESG
"You're No Good" – 3:12
"Moody" – 2:48
"UFO" – 2:56
"It's Alright" – 2:39
"Moody (Spaced Out)" – 4:18
"Tiny Sticks" – 3:03
"My Love For You" – 2:55
"Come Away" – 3:14
"Dance" – 4:32
"Parking Lot Blues" – 2:54
"Chistelle" – 1:54
"About You" – 2:05
"Erase You" – 4:08
"Get Funky" – 2:35
"Hold Me Right" – 2:56
"I Can't Tell You What To Do" – 4:06

Personnel
Deborah Scroggins – bass, vocals
Renee Scroggins – lead vocals, guitar
Valerie Scroggins – drums, vocals
Marie Scroggins – congas, vocals
Tito Libran – congas

References

ESG (band)  compilation albums
2000 compilation albums
Universal Sound compilation albums